Morrinho de Açúcar (Portuguese meaning "sugar hill") is a small hill in the northern part of the island of Sal in Cape Verde. It is situated 1 km from the north coast and 8 km north of the island capital Espargos. It is a remnant of a volcanic phonolitic chimney, surrounded by a vast plain. It is protected as a natural monument.

See also
List of mountains in Cape Verde
List of protected areas in Cape Verde

References

Mountains of Cape Verde
Geography of Sal, Cape Verde
Protected areas of Cape Verde